Meadows Township may refer to the following townships in the United States:

 Meadows Township, Stokes County, North Carolina
 Meadows Township, Wilkin County, Minnesota

See also 
 Meadow Township (disambiguation)